Travis Wiltzius is an American football coach. He served as the head football coach at Finlandia University in Hancock, Michigan from 2018 to 2021.

Coaching career

Finlandia
Wiltzius was named interim head coach of Finlandia in April 2018. The interim label was removed on November 12, 2018.

Head coaching record

References

External links
 Finlandia profile

Year of birth missing (living people)
Living people
Central Michigan Chippewas football coaches
Finlandia Lions football coaches
High school football coaches in Michigan
Central Michigan University alumni
People from Escanaba, Michigan
Coaches of American football from Michigan